Lee Freeman  is the  chief constable of Humberside Police. He was temporary deputy chief constable immediately after the previous chief constable, Justine Curran, stepped down. Freeman was promoted into the role of chief constable for Humberside in June 2017.

Career
Freeman joined the City of London Police in 1993, transferring to Lincolnshire Police in 1996. Having applied for the Accelerated Promotion Course in 1999 whilst still a constable, Freeman was successful and promoted to sergeant in September 2000. Remaining in Lincolnshire, he gained promotion to inspector, chief inspector and then to superintendent in 2005. A spell as an assistant director at Lincolnshire County Council preceded his promotion to xhief superintendent as divisional commander for South Division in 2010, with further spells as the divisional commander for West Division and also head of local policing following a major force restructure. In August 2013, he stepped up to Assistant Chief Constable for Local Policing in Lincolnshire for 18months. Freeman successfully applied for the vacant assistant chief constable post in Humberside Police in 2015 and moved from Lincolnshire, where he had been working previously. He was given the temporary deputy chief constable's post in February 2017 after the previous chief constable, Justine Curran, retired early when she was advised to consider her position by the Police and Crime Commissioner for Humberside]], Keith Hunter. Freeman applied for the subsequent vacant chief's job and was duly promoted into the rank of chief constable in June 2017.

In January 2019, Freeman and the police and crime commissioner, agreed that he would serve a temporary secondment to the Cleveland Police. The three-month secondment arose because of the sudden resignation of Chief Constable Mike Veale.

Freeman was awarded the King's Police Medal (KPM) in the 2023 New Year Honours.

Personal life
Freeman was born in Grimsby, Lincolnshire. He is married with one son. Before joining the police service, he attended Kingston Polytechnic where he gained a BSc (Hons) in Sociology.

References

Living people
People from Grimsby
Alumni of Kingston University
British Chief Constables
Humberside Police
1969 births
City of London Police officers
Recipients of the Queen's Police Medal